PGE Skra Bełchatów 2016–2017 season is the 2016/2017 volleyball season for Polish professional volleyball club PGE Skra Bełchatów.

The club competes in:
 Polish Championship
 Polish Cup
 CEV Champions League qualification
 CEV Champions League

Team roster

Players of PGE Skra Bełchatów on loan in season 2016/17:

Squad changes for the 2016–2017 season
In:

Out:

Most Valuable Players

Results, schedules and standings

2016–17 PlusLiga

Regular season

Semifinal

Final

2016–17 Polish Cup

Final four

2016–17 CEV Champions League qualification

Third round

2016–17 CEV Champions League

Pool D

Playoff 12

References

PGE Skra Bełchatów seasons